The Astonishing Adventures Of Mr Weems And The She Vampires is a video game developed by RamJam Corporation in 1987. The game is loosely based upon the 1985 Atari Games arcade title Gauntlet.

Gameplay
The player controls the eponymous Mr. Weems, the bespectacled protagonist who must wander through the six level, vampire-infested maze. The player fights vampires using his garlic gun. There is also a garlic pill which makes Mr. Weems immune from attack for a while.  He also has to collect keys to open locked doors which block access to higher levels.  The objective of the game is to reach the lair of the Great She Vampire and defeat her using a stake, mallet, mega-garlic piece, mirror and crucifix.

Reception
Mr. Weems and the She Vampires was published at a time when numerous Gauntlet clones were being released and received  criticism for its unoriginality. The Commodore 64 version scored only 19% from Zzap64 with reviewer Julian Rignall judging the game as "simply appalling".

References

External links

1987 video games
Amstrad CPC games
Commodore 64 games
Video games about vampires
Video games developed in the United Kingdom
ZX Spectrum games
Single-player video games